Ole Kristofer Randers (1 April 1851 – 15 March 1917) was a Norwegian poet and theatre critic. He made his literary debut in 1879 with the poetry collection Med Lyre og Lanse. His travel guide book on Sunnmøre, Søndmøre. Reisehaandbog from 1890, has been re-issued several times. He was also a theatre critic for the newspaper Aftenposten.

Selected works
Søndmøre. Reisehaandbog (1890)

References

External links
 

1851 births
1917 deaths
People from Aremark
19th-century Norwegian poets
Norwegian male poets
Norwegian theatre critics
19th-century Norwegian male writers